Agnar Aas (born 1951) is a Norwegian civil servant.

He was born in Gulen in Western Norway as a son of school director Sverre Aas, and grew up in Hyllestad and Leikanger. He graduated from the Norwegian College of Agriculture in 1976. He worked with estate exchange in Finnmark from 1976 to 1979, and then with forestry administration in Troms from 1979 to 1990. In 1990 he was appointed as the new director of the Directorate of State Forests. In 1993 the directorate was renamed Statskog. In 1998 he left the position and worked as a consultant, until he in 1999 was appointed as director of the Norwegian Water Resources and Energy Directorate. In late 2010 it was announced that he would retire in 2011.

He was a board member of Senter for Bygdeturisme from 1991 to 1995 (Center for rural tourism, a government organization which closed in 2000), NAVO from 1993 to 1996, Moelven Industrier from 1997 to 1999, the Norwegian Forest Research Institute from 1999 (this became defunct in 2006) and the Institute for Energy Technology from 2001.

As of 2008, he was married to Inger Marie (born approx. 1952) and has three adult children, as well as five grandchildren.

References

1951 births
Living people
People from Gulen
Norwegian College of Agriculture alumni
Directors of government agencies of Norway